Rodna Mountains are a subdivision of the Inner Eastern Carpathians in northern Romania. The name comes from the nearby Rodna Veche village. At ,  is the highest peak in all of the Eastern Carpathians.

The main ridge of the Rodna Mountains constitutes the natural border between Bistrița-Năsăud and Maramureș counties. From an administrative point of view, 80% of the massif's surface is in Bistrița-Năsăud and 20% in Maramureș.

Geography

The mountains are most suited for hiking in summer and skiing in winter, and are especially famous for having snow late into the summer months (skiing is possible well into June, sometimes even July). While the ridge itself poses no difficulties, the challenge is the massive length of it, and the absence of drinkable water (except for a few puddles that are usually dry). A complete hike along the main Rodnei ridge takes between 3 and 5 days, depending on the weather and the endurance of the hiker.

Location

The Rodna Mountains are partly in the region of Maramureș, in northern Romania, near the Romania–Ukraine border. To the north lies the town of Borșa and the village Moisei. 

The Prislop Pass and the  connect the Rodna Mountains to Western Moldavia. 

To the south lie the villages Rodna, Șanț, Maieru, and Anieș and the town of Sângeorz-Băi, in Bistrița-Năsăud County. The Someșul Mare River has its source in the Rodna Mountains and separates them from the Bârgău Mountains.

Access

The most used access points to the mountain are:
 Șetref Pass, by car or train, from the Dealu Ștefăniței train station.
 Borșa city, by car or bus; from the center of the city there is a path to the Iezer weather station and lake.
 Borșa ski resort, by car or bus; access is made from the top of the ski slope, directly to the main ridge at "Șaua Gărgălău".
 Prislop Pass, by car; from the pass there is a marked path that meets the one from the top of the ski slope, also leading to "Șaua Gărgălău".
 Rodna Veche village, by train or car; from the village there are two marked paths leading to the main ridge, one of them going directly to the Ineu Peak.

Accommodation

There are a few resorts at the base of the mountain, notably Borșa ski resort, with a few hotels and many privately run guesthouses, and also the new "Valea Blaznei" resort, completed in 2007, near the village Șanț. It contains two notable places to stay, "Cabana Vio" at 1,100 m (6 km from Șanț village), and a bit higher, "Cabana Diana" at 1,240 m, which is a mountain refuge. Up on the ridge there is no accommodation whatsoever, so tourists should bring tents.

Nature reserve
The entire Rodna Mountain is included in the Rodna National Park and Biosphere Reserve. This is a  reservation in the Eastern Carpathians with brown bears, lynx, gray wolves, black capercaillies, and eagles.

References

External links

 
 

Mountain ranges of Romania
Mountain ranges of the Eastern Carpathians
Nature reserves in Romania
Geography of Maramureș County
Tourist attractions in Maramureș County
Geography of Bistrița-Năsăud County
Tourist attractions in Bistrița-Năsăud County